Jean Van Guysse was a Belgian gymnast. He competed in the men's artistic individual all-around event at the 1908 Summer Olympics and won a silver medal in the team event at the 1920 Summer Olympics.

References

Year of birth missing
Year of death missing
Belgian male artistic gymnasts
Olympic gymnasts of Belgium
Gymnasts at the 1908 Summer Olympics
Gymnasts at the 1920 Summer Olympics
Olympic silver medalists for Belgium
Medalists at the 1920 Summer Olympics
Olympic medalists in gymnastics
Place of birth missing